Symphony No. 28 may refer to:

 Symphony No. 28 (Haydn)
 Symphony No. 28 (Michael Haydn)
 Symphony No. 28 (Mozart)

028